Kristján Andrésson (born 27 March 1981) is a Swedish-born Icelandic retired handball player and ex coach of the Swedish national team.

He competed in the 2004 Summer Olympics. Until 2020 he was the head coach for the Swedish national team.

He played several games for the Icelandic national team, including at the 2004 Olympics. He retired as a player in 2005 due to injury problems. He coached Eskilstuna Guif from 2007 to 2016. When he accepted the Sweden job, he became the fifth Icelander to be the active coach of a foreign national team at the time.

References

External links

1981 births
Living people
Kristjan Andresson
Kristjan Andresson
Kristjan Andresson
Handball players at the 2004 Summer Olympics
People from Eskilstuna
Kristjan Andresson
Kristjan Andresson
Handball coaches of international teams